North Port Passenger Terminal, also known as Terminal 2, is a terminal for passenger ferries, for roll on-roll off ferries (RORO), and for cruise ships located on Pier 4, Manila North Harbor, Port of Manila, Philippines. It is owned by Manila North Harbour Port Inc. and opened on October 9, 2013.

The terminal can accommodate 2-3 million passengers per year, greater than the old terminal which supported about 1.5 million passengers.

The terminal has a total area of about  including the main building, drop-off area, ticketing booths, and a  parking area. It features X-ray scanning area, luggage check-in area and has about 2,000 seating capacity. It can handle 5 vessels at any time.

On November 2, 2013, MV SuperStar Aquarius, a 51,300 gross tonner of Star Cruises, arrived at the terminal. On January 9, 2014, MV Costa Victoria of Costa Cruises, carrying 1,775 passengers, made its maiden call at the terminal.

References

External links
 http://www.mnhport.com.ph/ Manila North Harbour Port, Inc.

Ports and harbors of the Philippines
Buildings and structures in Tondo, Manila
Transportation in Manila
Manila Bay